The Columbus Cottonmouths were a professional ice hockey team based in Columbus, Georgia.  The team is nicknamed the Snakes and played their home games at the Columbus Civic Center. In 2017, the team suspended operations after failing to find a new owner.

History

Central Hockey League (CHL): 1996–2001
In 1996, the Columbus Cottonmouths started play in the Central Hockey League, joining the Macon Whoopee and Nashville Nighthawks as expansion entries that were originally slated to be in the Southern Hockey League before its demise in the summer of 1996.  Along with the Memphis RiverKings, an established CHL franchise, and the Huntsville Channel Cats, the SHL champion in 1996 and the lone surviving franchise from that league, Columbus and the other two expansion SHL teams formed the new Eastern Division of the CHL in the 1996–97 season. In 1998, the team won the CHL championship, defeating the Wichita Thunder in a four-game sweep.  The Cottonmouths were in the CHL playoffs each of their five seasons in the league, making it to the league finals in 2000 and 2001 before losing to the Indianapolis Ice and the Oklahoma City Blazers, respectively. In the summer of 2001, the CHL merged with the Western Professional Hockey League and geographic rivals in Huntsville and Macon were lost, leading the Cottonmouths to seek and obtain entry into the East Coast Hockey League.

DVA Sports, composed of owners Salvador Diaz-Verson and Shelby Amos, purchased the defunct Hampton Roads Admirals ECHL franchise, relocating it to Columbus under the Cottonmouths name.

East Coast Hockey League (ECHL): 2001–2004
From 2001 to 2004, the Columbus Cottonmouths organization played in the ECHL, bringing with them their longtime captain Jerome "Boom-Boom" Bechard and head coach Bruce Garber. In the three seasons that Columbus spent in the ECHL, they failed to make the playoffs. Midway through their second season in the ECHL, Garber, the only coach in team history, resigned. General manager Phil Roberto took over for the remainder of the season. Their best season in the ECHL was their last. Prior to the 2003–04 season the team announced the signing of their new coach, former NHL enforcer Brian Curran. They finished with a 37–27–8 record, tied with the Greensboro Generals for the best record by a non-playoff team that season.

In April 2004, the Cottonmouths management announced their intentions to move their ECHL franchise to the Bradenton-Sarasota area in Florida. The team, which was later named the Gulf Coast Swords, would never come to fruition as financial setbacks delayed the construction of their to-be home arena. Finally, after foreclosure on the arena property and numerous delays, the ECHL revoked the Swords franchise in the league in the summer of 2006.

Southern Professional Hockey League (SPHL): 2004–2017
In 2004, the Columbus Cottonmouths organization joined the Southern Professional Hockey League as one of its inaugural members. Led by first year coach, and Columbus hockey legend Jerome Bechard, the team won the first SPHL championship in April 2005 by first winning a one-game playoff against the Fayetteville FireAntz by a 4–2 score. They next swept the regular season champion Knoxville Ice Bears to advance to the league finals, which they won against the Macon Trax with two straight victories, ending with a 3–2 overtime win.  The Snakes' victory capped an undefeated postseason in which they won five games.

In 2007, the Columbus team won the SPHL Commissioner's Cup as the team with the best season record, but was ousted in the first round of playoffs by the Jacksonville Barracudas, who won the series three games to one. In 2008, the Snakes' 22–24–6 regular-season record was a Columbus hockey team's first losing record since 2002–03 and the first one by a non-ECHL team.

On April 14, 2012, the Cottonmouths won their second President's Cup championship with a two-game sweep of the Pensacola Ice Flyers. The Snakes won game one 3–2 at home and then completed the championship series with a 3–1 road victory over the Ice Flyers. The Cottonmouths went undefeated in the playoffs, 6–0.

On January 19, 2017, the bus carrying the Cottonmouths was involved in a rollover on I-74 on the way to play the Peoria Rivermen. 24 players and staff were injured in the accident. In March 2017, it was announced that owners Wanda and Shelby Amos were selling the team and that general manager and head coach Bechard was in charge of looking for a buyer. The Amos' cited mounting financial losses as their reason for trying to sell the team and that they would cease operations if a new buyer was not found. On May 3, 2017, the team official suspended operations for the 2017–18 season. However, SPHL commissioner Jim Combs confirmed that negotiations with a potential ownership were still ongoing but would only be ready for the 2018–19 season if the ownership transfer was successful. In June, the new potential ownership was confirmed as Residential World Media, headed by Fidel Jenkins, and that the purchase was still in negotiations with the SPHL. However, it was also stated that the "Cottonmouths" branding would not be included in the purchase and the team would instead be called the Columbus Burn. However, in August, the league terminated the application of the Burn to join the league.

In 2019, professional hockey returned to Columbus in the Federal Hockey League with the Columbus River Dragons.

Season-by-season records

Central Hockey League

East Coast Hockey League

Southern Professional Hockey League

Staff
Head coach – Jerome Bechard 
Athletic Trainer – Adam Norman
Equipment manager – Mike Nash

Championships

References

External links
Columbus Cottonmouths  (Official website)

Southern Professional Hockey League teams
Ice hockey clubs established in 1996
Defunct ECHL teams
Defunct Central Hockey League teams
Ice hockey teams in Georgia (U.S. state)
Sports in Columbus, Georgia
1996 establishments in Georgia (U.S. state)
Ice hockey clubs disestablished in 2017
2017 disestablishments in Georgia (U.S. state)